Qush Tepa District is a district of Jowzjan province, Afghanistan.

References

Districts of Jowzjan Province